Olga Andersson (1 October 1876 – 6 November 1943) was a Swedish film and stage actress.  She appeared in 25 films as a character actress between 1920 and her death in 1943.

Selected filmography
 Her Little Majesty (1925)
 The Tales of Ensign Stål (1926)
 His English Wife (1927)
 A Perfect Gentleman (1927)
 International Match (1932)
 Kanske en gentleman (1935)
 Kungen kommer (1936)
 The Quartet That Split Up (1936)
 The Lady Becomes a Maid (1936)
 Sara Learns Manners (1937)
 Emelie Högqvist (1939)
 A Sailor on Horseback (1940)
 Her Melody (1940)
 Nothing Is Forgotten (1942)
 The Case of Ingegerd Bremssen (1942)
 I dag gifter sig min man (1943)
 In Darkest Smaland (1943)

References

Bibliography
 Quirk, Lawrence J. The Films of Ingrid Bergman. Carol Publishing Group, 1975.
 Swenson, Karen. Greta Garbo.  Simon & Schuster, 1997.

External links

1876 births
1943 deaths
Swedish stage actresses
Swedish silent film actresses
Swedish film actresses
Actresses from Stockholm
20th-century Swedish actresses